Where I Stand may refer to:

 Where I Stand (album), a 1997 album by George Ducas
 "Where I Stand", a song by Days of the New from Days of the New (1997 album)
 "Where I Stand", a song by Mia Wray included on the soundtrack album Midnight Sun (Original Motion Picture Soundtrack)